Begin Here is the debut studio album by the English rock band the Zombies, released in April 1965 by Decca Records. The American version (titled The Zombies) repeated many of the tracks from it, but, as was common at the time, deleted some and substituted others.

The 1999 CD reissue on Big Beat expands the track line-up substantially with the addition of three songs from the band's 1965 UK EP The Zombies and alternative versions of "Sticks and Stones" and "It's Alright with Me", as well as demos of "I Know She Will" and "I'll Keep Trying". The demos of these last two tunes do not have the overdubs on the versions available on other albums.

The song "The Way I Feel Inside" was used in director Wes Anderson's film The Life Aquatic and is included in the film soundtrack. It was also covered by Taron Egerton for the animated film Sing.  Additionally, the song "She's Not There" as covered by Santana appears in Renny Harlin's film The Long Kiss Goodnight.  The song "Can't Nobody Love You" was used in the opening of a season 4 episode of the HBO series Girls.

Reception
In his retrospective review of the release, critic Mark Deming for AllMusic wrote "Given the wealth of fine original tunes that the Zombies released on various non-LP singles and EPs during this period, it's a shame that so much of Begin Here was given over to covers; it's still a fine album and certainly better than what most of their peers had to offer in 1965, but what could have been an achievement on a par with the Kinks' Face to Face or the Beatles' Rubber Soul ended up being something quite good instead of an unqualified triumph."

Track listing

Personnel
The Zombies
Colin Blunstone - lead vocals, tambourine, guitar
Rod Argent - keyboards, backing and lead vocals, harmonica on "Work 'n' Play" and "I Got My Mojo Working"
Paul Atkinson - guitar
Chris White - bass, backing vocals
Hugh Grundy - drums

Additional personnel
Ken Jones - piano on "Work 'n' Play", tambourine on "I Remember When I Loved Her"
Dezo Hoffmann - cover photography

References

The Zombies albums
1965 debut albums
Decca Records albums